Comedy World Cup is a British television comedy panel game produced by Open Mike Productions for Channel 4.  It was first broadcast on 15 September 2012 and last broadcast on 27 October 2012.  The show is presented by David Tennant and features two teams of celebrities, consisting of a captain and two guests.  In each episode the teams compete in seven rounds about British and American comedy. The show is a knock-out tournament with the winners of the first four episodes progressing into the semi-finals, and the winners of each of them compete in the final for the eponymous Comedy World Cup.

Rounds
The following are the rounds in the order they are played during each episode (unless noted, they feature in all episodes):

 The Year In Question: Each team is shown television clips and have to work out the year they were first broadcast as well as identify the theme tune played throughout.
 The Young Ones (episodes 1–3, 5–7): A child performs a stand-up routine based on a comedian, the teams have to identify the comedian the child is imitating.
 Book Group (episode 4): 3 extracts from a well-known comedian's autobiography is read out, and the team is to identify the author, points are awarded as follow; 3 points for one extract read out, 2 for the second extract and 1 for all three extracts.
 In the Frame: Both teams are shown stills of comedy films with the actors' flesh removed.  Once a team names the film they are then given a related question to answer.
 Sitcom Graveyard (episodes 1–3, 5 and 7): One team reads out three sitcom plots with only one of them being real, the other team has to work out which is real.  In the final (episode 7), one team chose to answer a question on 'Mind Your Language' leaving the other team with this round.
 Mind Your Language: (episodes 4, 6 and 7) A clip of a British sitcom remade abroad is shown and the teams have to work out what sitcom it is.  In the final (episode 7), one team chose to answer a question on this round leaving the other team with 'Sitcom Graveyard'.
 In the Spotlight: A member of each team is given one minute to answer quick-fire questions on a specific category.
 What Happens Next: A clip is shown to the teams and paused at a cliffhanger moment, the teams must say what follows on the clip.
 Quickfire Round: Tennant asks quick-fire questions for any panelist to buzz in and answer.

Episodes
 – indicates the winning team
Bold type – indicates the team captains

Notes

References

External links
 
 
 
 

2010s British comedy television series
2010s British game shows
2012 British television series debuts
2012 British television series endings
British panel games
Channel 4 comedy
Channel 4 panel games
English-language television shows
Television series about television